This is a list of the founders of English schools, colleges, and universities.

Oxford Colleges

Colleges of the University of Oxford were founded by:

Cambridge Colleges

Colleges of the University of Cambridge were founded by:

English schools

English schools were founded by:

English schools and colleges outside England
Sir Henry Lawrence - Lawrence Schools at Sanawar, Ooty
Claude Martin - La Martiniere College Schools at Lucknow, Kolkata and Lyon

See also
List of the oldest schools in the United Kingdom
List of the oldest schools in the world
Armorial of schools in the United Kingdom
Armorial of British universities

References

Founders of English schools and colleges
Founders of English schools and colleges
Founders, colleges
Founders, colleges
Founders